Sergiu Chirilov (pronounced with a ; born 5 June 1973) is a Moldovan football manager, futsalist and former professional footballer from Republic of Moldova.

Career

As player

Club
Sergiu Chirilov has played in the national championships of Moldova, Romania and Iran, at the clubs like Zimbru Chișinău, Rapid București, Sportul Studențesc, Zob Ahan ...

National team
In 1991–1999, Chirilov played 12 matches for Moldova national football team.

As manager
Sergiu Chirilov has the UEFA "PRO" lincense for coaches.
In 2007 – July 2008, he was the second coach at the Moldova U-21 national football team. In 2008, he became head coach of the Moldova U-16 national team. From 2008 to 2010 he was the head coach of the Moldova U-21 national football team, obtaining in his debut match a victory of 1–0 against Germany U-21. In 2012-2013 he worked as sport-director at the club Real-Succes. Since 19 June 2013 he has been the head coach of the second team FC Zimbru Chișinău.

Honours
 Zimbru Chișinău
 Divizia Națională
Champion (1): 1992
 Moldovan Cup
Winner (1): 2007

 Rapid București
 Liga I
Runner-up (1): 1999-2000

 Zob Ahan
 Iran Pro League
Runner-up (1): 2004

References

External links
 
 
 
 
 Profilul lui Sergiu Chirilov at blogger.com 

1973 births
Living people
Moldovan footballers
Moldova international footballers
Moldovan expatriate footballers
Association football forwards
FC Zimbru Chișinău players
FC Olimpia Satu Mare players
FC Sportul Studențesc București players
FC Rapid București players
CSM Unirea Alba Iulia players
People from Șoldănești District
FC SKA-Khabarovsk players
Moldovan football managers
Moldovan Super Liga managers
Moldovan Super Liga players
Expatriate footballers in Romania
Expatriate footballers in Belgium
Expatriate footballers in Russia
Expatriate footballers in Iran
Moldovan expatriate sportspeople in Romania
Moldovan expatriate sportspeople in Belgium
Moldovan expatriate sportspeople in Russia
Moldovan expatriate sportspeople in Iran